John Egeland may refer to:

 John Olav Egeland (born 1951), Norwegian journalist and editor
 John Oscar Egeland (1891–1985), Norwegian shipping leader